Gaudencio Mohaba Mesu (born 1970) is an Equatoguinean politician. He has served as the President of the Chamber of Deputies in Equatorial Guinea since July 2013.

References 

Living people
Equatoguinean politicians
Members of the Chamber of Deputies (Equatorial Guinea)
1970 births